List of species commonly used in bonsai.

A-D

E to G

H to L

M to P

Q to Z

References

Bibliography

External links
All the Primary Plants Used For Bonsai
List of plants suitable for bonsai in Indian subcontinent climate

 List
 
Lists of plants
Gardening lists
Lists of plant species